Bluebird Gap Farm is a public city park and petting zoo located in Hampton, Virginia, at 60 Pine Chapel Road. It is designed to resemble a working farm, and features farm animals and fowl of all types, and wild animals native to Virginia. 

It is also home to the city's volunteer master gardeners' demonstration garden.

History
Opening in 1966 under the name Old MacDonald's Farm, it is one of the city's oldest parks. It was then home to 105 donated and "loaned" domestic animals. Originally located on the site of the nearby Hampton Coliseum, the Farm moved to its current location on Pine Chapel Road in 1969, and sought to show animals in a farm setting to children from a city environment.

Events
Each year in late October the park hosts Boobird Spooktacular, a one-day event connected with Halloween. Starting in 2010, the Bluebird Gap Farm sponsors a 4-H Club for youths 5–18 years old.

Notes

References
Bluebird Gap Farm Bird Sightings List
Bluebird Gap Farm Volunteer Projects

External links

Parks in Hampton, Virginia
Virginia municipal and county parks
Zoos in Virginia
1966 establishments in Virginia